Westside Provisions is a mixed use neighborhood located in the West Midtown area of Atlanta, Georgia, United States.

History

Westside Provisions was formed in 2008 by the construction of a footbridge linking the Westside Urban Market to White Provision. White Provision occupies the White Provision Co. building, constructed in 1910 and expanded in 1922–1924 in the Industrial Gothic style. It served as a meat packing plant and was sold to Swift and Company.  In 1963 the property was converted into a bonded warehouse and in 1991 as a U-Haul storage center and as residential lofts. Westside Urban Market is built on the site of the 1917 United Butchers Abattoir, later the site of Stovall and Co. Both the abattoir and meat packing facility were established in proximity to the Miller Union Stockyards then located in the area from the 1880s through 1940s.

Neighborhood features 
Westside Provisions includes dining and national retailers. For retail, the development is anchored by a large Room & Board furniture store as well as Atlanta's second Anthropologie. The district includes additional restaurants, coffee shops, and high end home furnishings and apparel stores.

References

External links
@westsideprovisions

Neighborhoods in Atlanta